Benjamin Zablocki (January 19, 1941 – April 6, 2020) was an American professor of sociology at Rutgers University where he taught sociology of religion and social psychology. He published widely on the subject of charismatic religious movements, cults, and brainwashing.

Early life and education 
Born in Brooklyn, New York, Zablocki received his B.A. in mathematics from Columbia University in 1962 and his Ph.D. in social relations from the Johns Hopkins University in 1967, where he studied with James S. Coleman.

Career 
Zablocki was the Sociology department chair at Rutgers University. He published widely on the sociology of religion.

Zablocki was a supporter of what he called 'the brainwashing hypothesis'. Other scholars, Zablocki noted, commonly mistake brainwashing for both a recruiting and a retaining process, when it is merely the latter. This misunderstanding enables critics of brainwashing to set up a straw-man, and thereby unfairly criticize the phenomenon of brainwashing. For evidence of the existence of brainwashing, Zablocki refers to the sheer number of testimonies from ex-members and even ex-leaders of cults. Zablocki further alleges that brainwashing has been unfairly "blacklisted" from the academic journals of sociology of religion. Such blacklisters, Zablocki asserts, receive lavish funding from alleged cults and engage in "corrupt" practices.

Selected works

Books 
 The Joyful Community: An Account of the Bruderhof: A Communal Movement Now in Its Third Generation. Chicago: University of Chicago Press (1971, reissued 1980) 
 Alienation and Charisma: A Study of Contemporary American Communes. New York: The Free Press. (1980) 
 Misunderstanding Cults: Searching for Objectivity in a Controversial Field, Toronto, University of Toronto Press, 2001. w/ Thomas Robbins (Eds.)

Articles 
 The Blacklisting of a Concept: The Strange History of the Brainwashing Conjecture in the Sociology of Religion. Nova Religion, Oct. 1997
 Methodological Fallacies in Anthony's Critique of Exit Cost Analysis, ca. 2002,
 The Birth and Death of New Religious Movements ca. 2005
 Ethics and The Modern Guru ca. 2016 Interview on brainwashing

References

External links 
 

American sociologists
Researchers of new religious movements and cults
1941 births
Living people
Rutgers University faculty
Columbia College (New York) alumni
Johns Hopkins University alumni
Mind control theorists